Leslie Robinson (born 1 March 1967) is an English retired footballer who played as a defender. He played for Chesterfield, Mansfield Town, Stockport County, Doncaster Rovers, Banbury United and spent ten years at Oxford United where he is sixth in the list of players with the most appearances.

Born and raised in Shirebrook, the defender played football for Chesterfield F.C., before turning professional with Mansfield Town F.C. in 1984. Two years later he was sold on to Stockport County F.C. for a free transfer. He was sold on to Doncaster Rovers F.C. for £10,000. In March 1990, he was transferred to Oxford United for £150,000. He would later become the captain of Oxford and make 459 appearances for them.

In the later parts of his career and especially following retirement, Robinson's life changed. He is now an Assistant Head Teacher at Swalcliffe Park School, a school catering for boys with autism near Banbury.

Testimonial
On 7 May 2018, a testimonial match was played in his honour at the Kassam Stadium as Oxford played a Liverpool Legends XI. His grandchildren acted as the match's mascots. The game was played by famous ex-players from both sides, including Joey Beauchamp, Paul Kee and Phil Gilchrist for Oxford and Phil Neal, Alan Kennedy and Paul Walsh for Liverpool. Oxford won the match 1–0 with a goal from Paul Wanless.

External links
 Soccerbase profile
 BBC Sport article
 Robinson's testimonial
 Robinson's reaction to being offered a testimonial

References

1967 births
English footballers
Doncaster Rovers F.C. players
Mansfield Town F.C. players
Stockport County F.C. players
Oxford United F.C. players
Hednesford Town F.C. players
Banbury United F.C. players
Ardley United F.C. players
Living people
Association football defenders